Barbara Gordon (née Loeb) is an American documentary filmmaker and author. After graduating from Barnard College, she worked for almost 20 years in television as a writer and producer. She won two Emmys for her work on the Channel 2 Eye on Series Documentary for WCBS. She also worked on the PBS Emmy Award-winning series The Great American Dream Machine, where she filmed segments on Studs Terkel, Dalton Trumbo, and Jane Fonda.
In 1979, Gordon released her autobiography I'm Dancing as Fast as I Can, which follows her addiction to Valium and battle toward recovery. A film adaptation, directed by Jack Hofsiss and starring Jill Clayburgh as Gordon, was released in 1982.
Gordon is also the author of the novel Defects of the Heart and the nonfiction book Jennifer Fever.

She lives in New York City.

References

External links
Barbara Gordon - Chicago Tribune
Barbara Gordon. Huffington Post.
Breaking News - Hallmark Movie Channel Embarks on TV's Newest Holiday Destination "The Most Wonderful Movies of Christmas" with the Network's First-Ever Original Holiday Movie.... The Futon Critic, 24 July 2013.
Nyemmys.org - 18th Emmys
Nyemmys.org - 20th Emmys

Year of birth missing (living people)
Living people
American documentary filmmakers
American television producers
American women television producers
American television writers
Barnard College alumni
American women documentary filmmakers
American women television writers
21st-century American women